İşıqlı or Ishikhly or Ishygly may refer to:
İşıqlı, Fizuli, Azerbaijan
İşıqlı, Qubadli, Azerbaijan